Phacelia neomexicana, common names New Mexico phacelia and New Mexico scorpionweed, is a plant. The Zuni people mix the powdered root with water and use it for rashes.

References

neomexicana
Flora of the Southwestern United States
Plants used in traditional Native American medicine
Plants described in 1859